John White Abbott (13 May 1763 – 1851) was an English surgeon and apothecary in Exeter, remembered as a keen amateur painter in both watercolour and oils. His watercolours are close in style to those of his teacher, Francis Towne.

Life

Abbott was born on 13 May 1763 at Cowick near Exeter, Devon. He came from a wealthy family, which owned many estates in Exeter, one of which he eventually  inherited in 1825.

By profession a  surgeon and apothecary, he was a keen amateur painter in both watercolour and oils.  He studied in Exeter with Francis Towne, to whom he was also a friend and patron, and his watercolour style was based on Towne's. His watercolours were generally landscapes, for which he toured to the Lake District, but in oil he also did history paintings.  After inheriting an estate at the age of 62, he retired there, and was appointed a deputy lieutenant of Devonshire in 1831.

Abbott exhibited regularly at the Royal Academy between 1795 and 1805; he is last recorded exhibiting there in 1822.  His oil paintings were once well known but the great bulk of his work was landscape watercolours.  He had a series of etchings of his paintings created which was nearly complete at the time of his death. He made a sketching tour to Scotland and the Lake District in 1791.  It seems that Abbott never sold any of his paintings, and most of his works were retained by his family until well into the 20th century.  Despite this, in his lifetime he was better known than his teacher, Francis Towne, some of whose Italian views he copied.

Gallery

Notes

References 
 Andrew Wilton & Anne Lyles, The Great Age of British Watercolours, 1750–1880, 1993, Prestel, 

1763 births
1851 deaths
Deputy Lieutenants of Devon
18th-century English painters
English male painters
19th-century English painters
English surgeons
English watercolourists
19th-century English male artists
18th-century English male artists